Jantony Ortiz Marcano (born July 21, 1994) is a Puerto Rican professional boxer in the bantamweight division. As an amateur he represented Puerto Rico at the 2012 Summer Olympics as a bantamweight.

Amateur career
Considered a boxing prodigy, he became the youngest member in the history of the Puerto Rico national boxing team by winning the national championship at the age of 16. While still a youth competitor, Ortiz entered open class tournaments and became the bronze medallist at the 2011 Pan American Games. In May 2012, Ortiz qualified for the 2012 Summer Olympics by winning the gold medal at the 2012 American Boxing Olympic Qualification Tournament. During the olympics, he was defeated in the 'Round of 16' by former European champion David Ayrapetyan. The judges scored the first round 4-4, the second 5–3 in favor of Ayrapetyan, while the third round was scored a highly controversial 6-6.

Ortiz qualified to the 2013 AIBA World Boxing Championships, the first in over two decades to rely on the 10 point scoring system. In his opening fight, he defeated Severian Chiladze of Georgia by unanimous decision. To advance in the second round, Ortiz defeated the tenth seed of the tournament, Dominican Geraldo Pérez.

Professional boxing record

References

External links

1994 births
Living people
People from Humacao, Puerto Rico
Boxers at the 2012 Summer Olympics
Olympic boxers of Puerto Rico
Puerto Rican male boxers
Pan American Games bronze medalists for Puerto Rico
Pan American Games medalists in boxing
Boxers at the 2011 Pan American Games
Bantamweight boxers
Medalists at the 2011 Pan American Games